Armour Square Park, also known as Armour Square or Park No. 3, is a park in Chicago, Illinois featuring Beaux Arts architecture, designed by D.H. Burnham and the Olmsted Brothers.  The park was opened in March 1905, at a cost of $220,000.  It was named after Philip Danforth Armour, philanthropist and captain of industry.

References

External links
 Armour Square Park, Chicago Park District

Historic districts in Chicago
Parks on the National Register of Historic Places in Chicago
Historic districts on the National Register of Historic Places in Illinois
1905 establishments in Illinois
Armour Square, Chicago